Walklea is a monotypic genus of gastropods belonging to the family Odontocycladidae. The only species is Walklea rossmaessleri.

The species is found in the Balkans.

References

Gastropod genera
Stylommatophora